Beiyuan Subdistrict is a subdistrict of Xinhua District, Shijiazhuang, Hebei, People's Republic of China, located in the western part of the city. , it had 4 residential communities under its administration.

Translation 
The English literal translation of 北苑 (Běi yuàn) is "North" (北, Běi) "Court" (苑, Yuàn).  Though 苑 could also mean "Garden" or "Park".

See also
List of township-level divisions of Hebei

References

Township-level divisions of Hebei